Isaac Newton Mack (September 1, 1838 – June 3, 1925) was a merchant and political figure in Nova Scotia, Canada. He represented Queen's County in the Nova Scotia House of Assembly from 1874 to 1878 as a Liberal member.

He was born in Mill Village, Nova Scotia, of United Empire Loyalist descent, and was educated there and at Sackville. In 1872, he married Rachel Vaughan. Mack was chosen as speaker for the provincial assembly in 1877.

References
The Canadian parliamentary companion and annual register, 1877, CH Mackintosh

1838 births
Nova Scotia Liberal Party MLAs
Speakers of the Nova Scotia House of Assembly
1898 deaths